Hellemyr is a district in the city of Kristiansand in Agder county, Norway. It has a population of 2,990 (in 2014). The district is located in the borough of Grim. The district of Tinnheia lies to the east, the district of Slettheia lies to the south and the district of Grim lies to the north. Hellemyr is the last district to drive through before exiting Kristiansand via the European route E39 highway.

Hellemyr has one elementary school, and the junior high students attend Grim skole. Public transportation is available by bus, Nettbuss connects the district to the city centre in Kvadraturen. Buses from Hellemyr also connect to Tømmerstø. Hellemyr is mostly typical Norwegian residential suburb. Hellemyr Church is located in this district.

Transportation

Politics 
The 10 largest political parties in Hellemyr in 2015:

Neighbourhoods
Breimyr
Fidjemoen
Fjellro
Hellemyr nordøst
Hellemyr vest

Photos

References

Populated places in Agder
Geography of Kristiansand
Boroughs of Kristiansand